William Arthur Conceição dos Santos (born July 27, 1982 in Rio de Janeiro) is a Brazilian footballer who plays as a striker for Portuguese club Macaé.

References

1982 births
Living people
Brazilian footballers
Association football midfielders
Association football forwards
Expatriate footballers in Mexico
Expatriate footballers in Portugal
Brazilian expatriate sportspeople in Mexico
Brazilian expatriates in Portugal
Campeonato Brasileiro Série A players
Primeira Liga players
Clube Atlético Juventus players
Olaria Atlético Clube players
Associação Atlética Portuguesa (RJ) players
Associação Desportiva Cabofriense players
América Futebol Clube (RN) players
F.C. Paços de Ferreira players
Vitória F.C. players
Portimonense S.C. players
Duque de Caxias Futebol Clube players
Ipatinga Futebol Clube players
Associação Desportiva Itaboraí players
Macaé Esporte Futebol Clube players
Footballers from Rio de Janeiro (city)